Autretot is a former commune in the Seine-Maritime department in the Normandy region in northern France. On 1 January 2019, it was merged into the new commune Les Hauts-de-Caux.

Geography
The commune has the distinction of having been awarded the Grand Prix and four flowers     for its floral display.

Population

Places of interest
 The church of Notre-Dame, dating from the eighteenth century.

See also
Communes of the Seine-Maritime department

References

Former communes of Seine-Maritime